This is a list of Ministers of Defense of Peru.

List of Ministers of Defense

References

External links
 List of Military and Police awards at the Ministry of Defense, Peru (in Spanish)

Peruvian politicians
Military of Peru